This is a list of the first women lawyer(s) and judge(s) in Arizona. It includes the year in which the women were admitted to practice law (in parentheses). Also included are women who achieved other distinctions such becoming the first in their state to graduate from law school or become a political figure.

Firsts in Arizona's history

Lawyers 

 First female: Sarah Herring Sorin (1892) 
 First Hispanic American female: Mary Stella Cota-Robles (1940) 
 First African American female: Jean Williams (1949) 
First female to serve as the chief staff attorney for the Supreme Court of Arizona: Sarah D. Grant 
 First female to start a practice on Arizona Indian Reservation and serve as general counsel to the Havasupai: Martha Blue (1967) 
First Asian American female: Roxanne Song Ong (1979)

State judges 

 First female justices of the peace: Nellie T. Bush and Emeline Ferguson in 1914 
 First female to unsuccessfully run for court superior court judge: Gertrude Converse in 1948 
 First female (Arizona Superior Court): Lorna E. Lockwood (1925) in 1950
 First Latino American female (reputed): Anita Lewis Chávez (1947)
 First female (Chief Justice of the Arizona Supreme Court): Lorna E. Lockwood (1925) in 1970 
 First female (Arizona Court of Appeals): Mary M. Schroeder in 1975  
 First African American female: Jean Williams (1949) in 1977 
 First Asian American female: Roxanne Song Ong (1979) circa 1986 
 First African American female (justice of the peace): Pamela Gutierrez in 1994 
 First Asian American female (Arizona Superior Court): Rosa Mroz in 2004 
 First Latino American female (Arizona Court of Appeals): Patricia A. Orozco (1989) in 2004  
 First openly lesbian female: Tracey Nadzieja in 2018 
 First Navajo female (chief justice of tribal high court): Claudine Bates-Arthur (1970)
 First Muslim female (justice of the peace pro tempore): Laila Ikram (2022)

Federal judges 

First Latino American female (U.S. District Court for the District of Arizona): Mary H. Murguia (1985) in 2000 
First Native American (Hopi) female (U.S. District Court for the District of Arizona): Diane Humetewa (1993) in 2014

Attorney General of Arizona 

First female: Janet Napolitano (1983) from 1999-2003

Assistant Attorney General 

 First female: Lorna E. Lockwood (1925) in 1948

United States Attorney 

 First female: Mary Anne Richey (née Reimann) in 1960 
First Native American (Hopi) female: Diane Humetewa (1993) in 2007

Assistant United States Attorney 

 First female: Mary Anne Richey (née Reimann) around 1954

County Attorney 

 First female: Rose Sosnowsky Silver in 1969 
First Latino American female: Patricia A. Orozco (1989) in 1999

Assistant County Attorney 

 First female: Loretta Savage Whitney in 1943

Political Office 

 First openly bisexual female (elected to the U.S. Congress): Kyrsten Sinema (2005) in 2013

State Bar of Arizona 

 First female (president): Roxana C. Bacon in 1991 
First openly lesbian female (president): Amelia Craig Cramer in 2012 
First Asian American (female) (president): Lisa Loo (1988) in 2016 
First Latino American female (president): Jessica Sanchez in 2022

Firsts in local history 
 Donna Grimsley: First female to serve on the Apache County Superior Court, Arizona (2003)
 Ann Littrell: First female to serve on the Cochise County Superior Court in Arizona
 Helen Colton: First female judge in Coconino County, Arizona (1919)
Ann Kirkpatrick (1979): First female Deputy County Attorney for Coconino County, Arizona
Daisy Flores: First female County Attorney in Gila County, Arizona
Monica Lynn Stauffer: First female to serve on the Superior Court of Greenlee County, Arizona (1998)
Jessica Quickle: First female judge in La Paz County, Arizona (2018)
Anita Lewis Chávez (1947): Reputed to be the first Latino American female lawyer in Maricopa County, Arizona
Gloria Ybarra: First Hispanic female to serve on the Maricopa County Superior Court, Arizona (1985)
Sarah D. Grant: First female to serve as the Presiding Criminal Judge in the Maricopa County Superior Court
Rosa Mroz: First Asian American female to serve on the Maricopa County Superior Court (2004)
 Barbara Rodriguez Mundell: First Hispanic female to serve as the Presiding Judge of Maricopa County, Arizona (2005)
 Roxanne Song Ong: First Asian female to serve as the Presiding Judge of the Phoenix Municipal Court (Maricopa County, Arizona; 2005)
Allister Adel: First female to serve as the County Attorney of Maricopa County, Arizona (2019)
Charlotte Wells: First female judge in Mohave County, Arizona (2002)
Carolyn Holliday: First female elected to the Superior Court of Navajo County, Arizona, (1996) and serve as its Presiding Judge (1999)

 Mary Anne Richey (née Reimann): First female to serve as the Deputy County Attorney in Pima County, Arizona (1952)
Alice Truman: First female Justice of the Peace and judge in Pima County, Arizona (1962)
Rose Sosnowsky Silver: First female appointed as the Pima County Attorney (1969)
Barbara LaWall (1976): First female elected as the Pima County Attorney (1996)
Lina Rodriguez (1977): First Hispanic American to serve on the Pima County Superior Court, Arizona (1984)
Laine Sklar: First female magistrate in Marana, Arizona (c. 2006) [Pima County, Arizona]
Margarita Bernal (c. 1979): First Latino American female to serve as a municipal court judge in Tucson, Arizona [Pima County, Arizona]
Anna Montoya-Paez: First female elected to the Santa Cruz County Superior Court, Arizona
Sheila Polk (1982): First female to serve as the Yavapai County Attorney (2004)
Nellie T. Bush and Emeline Ferguson: First females elected as Justices of the Peace in Yuma County, Arizona (1914)
Patricia A. Orozco (1989): First Latino American female appointed as the County Attorney for Yuma County, Arizona (1999)

See also  

 List of first women lawyers and judges in the United States
 Timeline of women lawyers in the United States
 Women in law

Other topics of interest 

 List of first minority male lawyers and judges in the United States
 List of first minority male lawyers and judges in Arizona

References 

Lawyers, Arizona, first
Arizona, first
Arizona, first
Women, Arizona, first
Women, Arizona, first
Women in Arizona
Arizona lawyers
Lists of people from Arizona